Professor Rezaul Karim Mannan is a Bangladesh Nationalist Party politician and a former three-time Member of Parliament for Narayanganj-3.

Early life and family
Rezaul Karim Mannan was born to a Bengali Muslim family in the village of Ramgovindapur in present-day Shambhupura Union, Sonargaon Upazila, Narayanganj District. He has one son with his wife Suraiya Karim Munni, a lawyer who died on 13 February 2017.

Career
Karim was elected to parliament from Narayanganj-3 as a Bangladesh Nationalist Party candidate in 1991, 1996, and 2001.

References

Bangladesh Nationalist Party politicians
Living people
8th Jatiya Sangsad members
Year of birth missing (living people)
People from Sonargaon Upazila